Transit police (also known as transport police, railway police, railroad police and several other terms) are specialized police agencies employed either by a common carrier (a transit district, railway, railroad, bus line, or any other mass transit provider) or a municipality, county, district, or state. Transit law enforcement services may also be provided by a specialized unit within a larger local law enforcement agency. Their mandate is to prevent and investigate all crime committed against the carrier or its passengers, as well as crime incidentally committed onand sometimes aroundthe carrier's property.

Type

Autonomous agencies

A transit police force may consist of officers employed directly by a transit system or by a government agency dedicated to providing specialized law enforcement services.  There are numerous instances of both within United States, given the decentralized nature of US law enforcement; examples of larger, stand-alone agencies within the US include the MBTA Police, BART Police, and the New Jersey Transit Police Department. In the United Kingdom, transit law enforcement is provided by a single, nation-wide agency, the British Transport Police, although other law enforcement agencies may assist with this task. Within India, many transit policing services are conducted by the Government Railway Police.

Specialized units of local law enforcement agencies

Other forces may exist as a specialized unit of a local law enforcement agency, such as the United States' Transit Police Services Bureau of the Orange County, California Sheriff's Department (which serves the Orange County Transportation Authority) or the Transit Enforcement Unit of the Phoenix Police Department (assigned to the Phoenix Public Transit Department). Some formerly independent transit police agencies have also been absorbed into (or had their duties assumed by) a larger, local law enforcement agency; Examples include the LACMTA Police's duties being assumed by the LAPD Transit Services Division and the New York City Transit Police being integrated into the NYPD Transit Bureau.

Railroad police

Where the term "transit police" is used for a law enforcement agency or unit working for a railroad/railway, it usually refers to a railroad providing urban mass transit (such as a city-elevated system or subway) as opposed to long-distance rail carriage.

Law enforcement agencies of both cargo railroads and long-haul rail carriers are usually referred to as "railroad police" or "railway police". There is often considerable overlap in transit police and railroad police agencies’ duties. Railroad police agencies, however, have a long history, and were established separate from and prior to most modern transit police agencies. Transit police and railroad police powers may also be legally defined separately; For example, in the United States, many states have separate laws concerning both types of agencies.

However, in modern times, with increasing overlap in duties and the proliferation of extensive mass transit systems, some jurisdictions have opted for a hybrid model of railroad and transit policing. For instance, in the United Kingdom, most of the rail systems, including the London Underground, are policed by the British Transport Police (BTP). The BTP is a full-service, national law enforcement agency, which essentially combined the duties of dozens of now-defunct transit and railway police agencies into a single entity (the BTP has no authority in Northern Ireland, except in emergencies).

Powers
Some transit police forces have full policing powers, such as the US' BART Police, SEPTA Transit Police, Metro Transit Police Department, Utah Transit Authority Police Department or the MBTA Police. The UK's British Transport Police, also has full police powers within Great Britain. In some areas, transit police agencies have limited or specific powers, and may be classed as special police or special constables, or peace officers with limited powers, such as Canada's Edmonton Transit Peace Officers. Regardless, transit police services nearly always hold more authority than un-sworn, security guard-only services.

Crimes

Some of the crimes transit police and railroad police investigate include trespassing on the right-of-way of a railroad, assaults against passengers, tagging of graffiti on railroad rolling stock and buses or bus stops, pickpocketing, ticket fraud, robbery and theft of personal belongings, baggage or freight, and drug dealing at transit stations. They may also engage in random ticket checking hoping to catch and fine ticketless travelers. These controls are usually more frequent in transit systems using an honor-based fare collecting approach.

Jurisdiction and authority

In federal states like the United States, Canada, or Australia, federal and state statutes determine the jurisdiction and authority of all police departments, including transit police.

Most transit police services have the same police authority as any other national, state and local police agencies, such as the MBTA Transit Police Department, MARTA (Atlanta) Transit Police, British Transport Police, New Jersey Transit Police Department, BART Police, Maryland Transit Administration Police, DART Police, SEPTA Transit Police, Utah Transit Authority Police Department, and the Metro Vancouver Transit Police (South Coast British Columbia Transportation Authority Police Service). Some agencies have rather extensive jurisdictions, including traffic enforcement and arrest powers on and off property, for example, the New Jersey Transit Police Department maintains the distinction of being the only transit police agency in the United States with statewide authority.

List of specialised transit/transport police agencies and departments

Australia
New South Wales
Commuter Crime Unit, New South Wales Police Force
Police Transport Command New South Wales Police Force as of 2013.
Transit Officers, RailCorp Closed down as of October 2013.

Queensland
Railway Squad, Queensland Police
Authorised Officers, Queensland Rail
TransLink Senior Network Officers, TransLink
Customer Service Officers, G:link

South Australia
Transit Services Branch, South Australia Police (all public transport in Adelaide). Private security also maintain a presence, especially during peak hours or events.

Victoria
Transit Safety Division, Victoria Police members and Protective Services Officers (predominantly operate in Melbourne)
Authorised Officers employed by Public Transport operator companies and by Public Transport Victoria (PTV).

Western Australia
Police Rail Unit, Western Australia Police (operating in Perth)
Transit Officers, Public Transport Authority of Western Australia

Canada

Police forces 
 Metro Vancouver Transit Police
 Canadian Pacific Police Service
 Canadian National Police Service
 Via Rail Police Service

Special constables 

Other large Canadian transit networks use security officers appointed as special constables or peace officers. As special constables, they typically have full police powers when working on transit property to enforce the Criminal Code of Canada, as well as respective Bylaws. Whilst they carry some police equipment, such as a protective vest, baton, handcuffs and pepper spray, they do not carry a firearm. These officers assist local jurisdiction's police officers in investigations of illegal activity on the transit system.
Calgary Transit Public Safety and Enforcement Section
Edmonton Transit Protective Services
GO Transit Special Constables
OC Transpo Special Constable Service
Société de Transport de Montréal Sûreté et Controle
Toronto Transit Commission Transit Enforcement Unit
Toronto Police Service also has a Transit Patrol Unit to assist TTC special constables and patrol the network.
YRT/Viva Special Constable Services

People's Republic of China
Cities in China which have rapid transit systems all have their transit police force associated to the local public security bureau. There are no non-governmental police forces, or police institutes under transit authority. National Rail used to have a police force under the Ministry of Railways, but such authority has since been transferred to local police agencies.

However, the structure of institutions can be vary from city to city. For example, cities like Tianjin and Chengdu might have a joint public transportation force of division level, operates on all the taxis, bus routes, coaches, rapid transit and ferry lines as well as transportation hubs inside city limit; while Chongqing and Xi'an have tighter transit cop brigades focused exclusively on protecting the mass transit lines. Again, all these agencies are supervised by the PSBs of higher level.

Hong Kong
Railway District, Hong Kong Police Force

France
Police Régionale des Transports (Police Nationale) - operates on Paris' suburban trains, and metro
Service National de Police Ferroviaire (Police Nationale-Direction Centrale de la Police aux Frontières) - operates on mainline trains
Service Interdépartemental de Sécurité dans les Transports en Commun (SISTC) - Police Nationale - Direction Centrale de la Sécurité Publique
Surveillance Générale (Suge) - operates on SNCF railways. This private service, run by the SNCF, has restricted police powers
Groupe de Protection et de Sécurisation des Réseaux (GPSR) - operates on RATP railways. This private service, run by the RATP, has restricted police powers
Police des Transports de l'Agglo Orléans Val de Loire - operates on bus, tram and train service in the Orléans Métropole

Germany
 former German Democratic Republic: Transportpolizei
 Federal Republic of Germany: Bahnpolizei (merged into Federal Police)

India
 Railway Protection Force renamed as Indian Railway Protection Force Service.

The Indian Railway Protection Force Service (IRPFS) is a security force, established by the Railway Protection Force Act, 1957 ; enacted by the Indian Parliament for "the better protection and security of railway property".

It has the power to search, arrest, investigate and prosecute, though the ultimate power rests in the hands of the Government Railway Police. The force is under the authority of the Indian Ministry of Railways.

 Commando for Railway Security (CORAS)
Government Railway Police

The Government Railway Police (IAST: Sarakārī Rēlvē Pulīs), abbreviated as GRP, is the police force of the Indian Railways. It was established by the Railways Act, 1989, of the Parliament of India. Its duties correspond to those of the District Police in the areas under their jurisdiction, such as patrolling, but only on railway property. It is the parent agency of the Railway Protection Force, and aids and provides assistance to it, whose primary duties are to protect and secure all railway property.

The GRP's responsibility is to observe law and order on all railway property. Officers are recruited from the Indian Police Service. The force is under joint-control of the Indian Ministry of Railways and the police departments of the various state police departments of India

 State Highway Police

Italy
Railway Police (Polizia Ferroviaria), Polizia di Stato

Latvia
Port Police (Ostas Policija)

Netherlands

Railway police
Railway Police Service (Unit insfrastructuur, dienst spoor), Dutch National Police (Landelijke Politie eenheid)

Transit enforcement
In The Netherlands, all public transport companies providing public service have their own enforcement officers, these officers often have the BOA status (special investigation officer) and limited police powers (use of force, arrest and use of handcuffs) the main task of these officers is fare enforcement and securing the safety of the public and employees within the transport vehicles.
The city of Amsterdam, is the only municipality in the Netherlands which operates its own transit enforcement department. The "Veiligheidsteam openbaar vervoer" (Safety team public transport) cooperates with the Amsterdam police in maintaining public order within the public transport, stations an hubs within the city limits, prevent or stop crimes, public assistance, issuing transit information and spotting suspicious behavior. Their uniforms are similar to that of police officers (police style hat, yellow high-visibility jacket and trousers with side striping; the only difference with the uniform of a police officer is that the trouser and hat color are dark grey whereas the police uses navy blue. These enforcement officers are employed by the city, whereas the police officers are employed by the national police. Enforcement officers are equipped with handcuffs and a short police baton and have limited police powers like the use of force, making arrests, detaining people and issuing fines. The city of Amsterdam is currently looking into the possibility to equip the officers with a can of pepperspray; this will probably be in mid 2014.

Poland
Railway Security Guard : Armed security forces protecting railway system in Poland https://pl.wikipedia.org/wiki/Stra%C5%BC_Ochrony_Kolei

Russian Federation
Main Directorate of the Transport of the Ministry of Internal Affairs. (Главное Управление на Транспорте Министерства Внутренних Дел.)

Singapore
 Public Transport Security Command, Singapore Police Force

Sweden
 Swedish Police Authority, Stockholm metro police

Taiwan
 National Police Agency, Railway Police: Railway Police Bureau, MRT Police Taipei City Police Department Rapid Transit Division, Kaohsiung City Police Department Rapid Transit Division

United Kingdom
British Transport Police (national railways in Great Britain, the London Underground, Docklands Light Railway, West Midlands Metro, Tramlink, Tyne and Wear Metro - Sunderland extension, Glasgow Subway)
 Belfast Harbour Police — Belfast Harbour, Belfast: HDPCA incorporated by section 5 of the Belfast Harbour Act 1847.
 Port of Bristol Police — Port of Bristol, Bristol. Includes Avonmouth Dock, Bristol, Royal Portbury Dock, North Somerset, and 3 islands in the Bristol Channel: Denny Island, Flat Holme, Steep Holme.
 Port of Felixstowe Police — Port of Felixstowe, Suffolk: HDPCA incorporated by section 3(1)(e) of the Felixstowe Dock and Railway Act 1956.
Port of Portland Police — Portland Harbour, Isle of Portland: HDPCA incorporated by section 3 of the Portland Harbour Revision Order 1997.
 Falmouth Docks Police — Falmouth Docks, Falmouth, Cornwall: HDPCA incorporated by section 3 of the Falmouth Docks Act 1959.
 Port of Dover Police — Port of Dover, Dover: HDPCA incorporated by section 3 of the Dover Harbour Consolidation Act 1954, and incorporation amended by part 4 of the Dover Harbour Revision Order 2006. Given the large amount of property owned by the port, their jurisdiction effectively extends to all of Dover and now throughout Kent in order to be able to take arrested persons to Custody Suites.
 Port of Liverpool Police — Port of Liverpool, Liverpool: current authority derives from article 3 of the Mersey Docks and Harbour (Police) Order 1975. Port of Liverpool police officers are Crown police officers and not special constables.
 Port of Tilbury Police (formerly the Port of London Authority Police) — Port of Tilbury, Essex: current authority derives from section 154 of the Port of London Act 1968
 Tees and Hartlepool Port Authority Harbour Police — Tees and Hartlepool: current authority derives from section 103 of the Tees and Hartlepool Port Authority Act 1966
Roads and Transport Policing Command Safer Transport Teams, Metropolitan Police – Transport for London buses, bus stations/interchanges, taxis and roads.
Metro Unit, Northumbria Police
Metrolink Unit, Greater Manchester Police
 Belfast International Airport Constabulary – attested under article 19(3) of the Airports (Northern Ireland) Order 1994 as constables for the airport, which employs them.
 Mersey Tunnels Police – attested under section 105 of the County of Merseyside Act 1980 as constables in and around the tunnels.

United States
Amtrak Police
BART Police
BNSF Police Department
Burbank-Glendale-Pasadena Airport Authority Police
Dallas Area Rapid Transit (DART) Police Department
Delaware River and Bay Authority Police Department
Delaware River Port Authority Police Department
Greater Cleveland Transit Police Department
Long Beach Harbor Patrol
Los Angeles Airport Police
Los Angeles Port Police
Maryland Transit Administration Police
Maryland Transportation Authority Police
Massachusetts Bay Transportation Authority (MBTA) Transit Police Department
Metra Police Department (Chicago)
Metro Transit Police Department, King County Sheriff's Office
MetroLink Unit, St. Louis County Police Department
Airport Police Division, St. Louis Metropolitan Police Department
Metropolitan Atlanta Rapid Transit Authority (MARTA) Police Department
Metropolitan Transit Authority of Harris County (METRO) Transit Police Department
Metro Transit - Minnesota Police Department
Metro Transit Police (Akron, Ohio)
Napa Valley Railroad Police Department
New Jersey Transit Police Department
New York City Police Department Transit Bureau (New York City Subway)
New York City Transit Police - (Merged into the NYPD in 1995)
 New York MTA Metropolitan Transportation Authority Police
New York, Susquehanna and Western Railway Police Department
Niagara Frontier Transportation Authority Transit Police Department
Northern Indiana Commuter Transportation District Transit Police Department (South Shore Line)
OCTA-Transit Police Services Bureau, Orange County Sheriff's Department
Port Authority of Allegheny County Police Department
Port Authority of New York and New Jersey Police Department (responsible for PATH)
Port of Portland Police Department (Oregon)
Public Transportation Section, Chicago Police Department
SEPTA Transit Police
Transit Services Bureau, Los Angeles County Sheriff's Department
Union Pacific Police Department
Utah Transit Authority Police Department
Via Metropolitan Transit Police Department
Washington Metro Transit Police Department

See also

 1995 Paris Métro and RER bombings
 2004 Madrid train bombings
 7 July 2005 London bombings
 21 July 2005 London bombings
 2006 Mumbai train bombings
 2006 Madrid-Barajas Airport bombing
 2007 Samjhauta Express bombings
 Public transport security
 Sarin gas attack on the Tokyo subway
 Security on the Mass Rapid Transit (Singapore)
 September 11 attacks
 Penalty fare
Fare evasion

References

Law enforcement units
Public transport